Mariya Omelianovych ( Danilyuk, born 21 September 1960) is a Ukrainian rower who represented the Soviet Union.

Career
She had qualified for the 1984 Summer Olympics but did not go due to the boycott led by the Soviet Union. Instead, she competed at the Friendship Games, also dubbed the "alternative Olympics", and won first place in single scull. At the 1985 World Rowing Championships in Hazewinkel, Belgium, she came sixth in the single scull event.

She competed at the 1988 Summer Olympics in Seoul with the women's double sculls where they came fourth. At the 1989 World Rowing Championships in Bled, she won silver with the quad scull. In the same boat class but with different team compositions, she won two further silver medals in 1990 and 1991.

References

1960 births
Living people
Soviet female rowers
Ukrainian female rowers
Olympic rowers of the Soviet Union
Rowers at the 1988 Summer Olympics
World Rowing Championships medalists for the Soviet Union
Sportspeople from Chernivtsi